Richard O. Duda  is Professor Emeritus of Electrical Engineering at San Jose State University renowned for his work on sound localization and pattern recognition. He lives in Menlo Park, California.

Education 
Duda received B.S. and M.S. degrees in Engineering from the University of California, Los Angeles in 1958 and 1959, and the PhD in Electrical Engineering from Massachusetts Institute of Technology in 1962.

Career 

While at SRI International, Duda and Peter E. Hart were the authors of "Pattern Classification and Scene Analysis", originally published in 1973. This classic text is a widely cited reference, and the first edition was in print for over 25 years until being superseded by the second edition in 2000.

Duda is an IEEE Fellow and a AAAI Fellow.

See also 
 Expert systems
 Pattern recognition
 Hough transform

References

Living people
San Jose State University faculty
People from Menlo Park, California
SRI International people
Fellow Members of the IEEE
Fellows of the Association for the Advancement of Artificial Intelligence
MIT School of Engineering alumni
UCLA Henry Samueli School of Engineering and Applied Science alumni
Year of birth missing (living people)